Susan M. Love (born February 9, 1948) is an American surgeon, a prominent advocate of preventive breast cancer research, and author. She is regarded as one of the most respected women’s health specialists in the United States. In 2012 Love announced that she was diagnosed with leukemia and would take a leave of absence to pursue chemotherapy treatment. After a successful treatment, Love returned to work the following year.

Early life and education
Love was born in Little Silver, New Jersey and moved to Puerto Rico as a teenager. She enrolled at Fordham University after having spent five unsuccessful months as a nun with the School Sisters of Notre Dame.

She received her medical degree from SUNY Downstate Medical School cum laude in 1974 and did her surgical residency at Boston's Beth Israel Medical Center.  She also graduated from the Executive MBA program at the UCLA Anderson School of Management.

Career
Love is a clinical professor of surgery at the David Geffen School of Medicine at UCLA. In 1998 she was appointed by former President Clinton to serve on the National Cancer Advisory Board, where she served until 2004. She maintains a board position at the National Cancer Institute, and continues to serve as an Adjunct Professor of Surgery at UCLA. Love also serves as the medical director of the Dr. Susan Love Research Foundation, formerly titled The Santa Barbara Breast Cancer Institute.

Bibliography (selective)

Books
Dr. Susan Love’s Menopause and Hormone Book  (2003)
Live a Little!: Breaking the Rules Won't Break Your Health (2009)
Dr. Susan Love's breast book (1990)

Peer-reviewed articles

See also 

 Cancer (2015 PBS film)
 The Emperor of All Maladies: A Biography of Cancer

Further reading

References

External links
Dr. Susan Love Research Foundation
The Love/Avon Army of Women

1948 births
Living people
American surgeons
Fordham University alumni
People from Little Silver, New Jersey
SUNY Downstate Medical Center alumni
UCLA Anderson School of Management alumni
David Geffen School of Medicine at UCLA faculty
Women surgeons